Shattock v Devlin [1990] 2 NZLR 88 is a cited case in New Zealand regarding the defence of Implied license to enter a property to a trespass claim.

References

Court of Appeal of New Zealand cases
New Zealand tort case law
1990 in New Zealand law
1990 in case law